Rede Aparecida, also known as TV Aparecida is a Brazilian religious television channel based in the municipality of Aparecida in the state of São Paulo.

History 
TV Aparecida was an initiative with support from the Catholic Church. The Foundation Our Lady of Aparecida, the sponsor of radio for Aparecida, won the award to broadcast on UHF channel 59 of Aparecida - SP which went live on September 8, 2005.

In April 2010, it became part of the grid Telefónica Digital TV. That same year, on August 23, TV Aparecida made a partnership with the New Song and it held the station's first presidential debate. It is the first of its kind for a religious TV station in Brazil.

Programs 

Reality shows/Game shows

 Revelações Brasil
 Revelações Sertanejo
 Tudo em Família
 Quarta Show

Other programs

 Aparecida Sertaneja
 Brazil Elector (TV Cultura) (Brasil Eleitor)
 Forward (Em Frente)
 Living Area (Espaço Vida)
 Family in Focus (Família em Foco)
 Marine World (Mundo Marinho)
 New Telecourse (Novo Telecurso)
 Tuning (TV Camara) (Sintonia)
 TVendo & Learning (TVendo e Aprendendo)
 Via Legal 
 Brazil Off-Road (Brasil Off-Road)
 More Sports (Mais Esportes)
 Family Cinema (Cine Família)
 Super Wednesday (Super Quarta)
 Clubti
 Et Cetera 
 TJ Aparecida
 TJ Aparecida - Highlights of the Week (TJ Aparecida - Destaques da Semana)
 Curtains (Cortinas)
 Route Musical (Rota Musical)
 Directions - The Brazil of Song (Itaú Cultural) (Rumos - O Brasil da Música)
 Land of the Patron (Terra da Padroeira)
 Angelus with the Pope (CTV) (Angelus com o Papa)
 Welcome Romero (Bem-Vindo Romeiro)
 Consecration (Consagração)
 God With Us (Deus Conosco)
 God in My House (Deus em Minha Casa)
 Meeting with Devotees (Encontro com os Devotos)
 Holy People (Gente Santa)
 Church in Brazil (Igreja no Brasil)
 Mother Mary (Mãe Maria)
 Mass in Aparecida (Missa de Aparecida)
 Mass Matrix Basilica of Aparecida (Missa de Aparecida - Matriz Basílica)
 Mass of Padre Cicero (Missa do Padre Cícero)
 Novena of Aparecida (Novena de Aparecida)
 Think like Jesus thought (Pensar como Jesus Pensou)
 Third of Aparecida (Terço de Aparecida)
 Time (Na Hora)
 On the Road (Pé na Estrada)
 Flavor of Life (Sabor de Vida)
 Sanctuary in Action (Santuário em Ação)
 All Craft (Tudo Artesanal)
 Southern Living (Vida no Sul)
 Familia Rocha
 Apostles
 Laurel and Hardy
 Teresa of Los Andes

See also 
2005 in Brazilian television
Catholic television
Catholic television channels
Catholic television networks
Television in Brazil

References

External links 
  Official site

Television networks in Brazil
Television channels and stations established in 2005
2005 establishments in Brazil
Catholic television channels